Audrey McInnis is a former Jamaican cricketer who played for Jamaica in three Women's ODIs as a part of the inaugural Women's Cricket World Cup in 1973. She made her Women's One Day International debut against Trinidad and Tobago in a group stage match during the 1973 Women's Cricket World Cup.

References

External links 
 

Date of birth missing (living people)
Year of birth missing (living people)
Possibly living people
Jamaican women cricketers
West Indian women cricketers